Santa Cruz Yachts was a U.S.-based yacht design and manufacturing company.  The offices and production facilities were located in Santa Cruz, California before being moved to Greencove Springs, Florida.

History 
Santa Cruz Yachts, founded by Bill Lee, has a 35-year history of designing and building sailing yachts.  The emphasis has been on ultra-light high performance racing designs generally offering amenities for long-distance voyages.  Santa Cruz Yachts has produced award-winning designs and these boats have performed well in racing including long-distance ocean racing.

In 1981 Merlin again won the Transpac, but this time seven of the top ten finishes were the Santa Cruz 50, a scaled down production version of Merlin. A  Santa Cruz yacht weighs about 16,000 pounds with half of that weight in the ballast of the keel; this is very light compared to the 30,000 pounds normally associated with a  boat.

Santa Cruz today 

The Santa Cruz line has matured into a niche market of large, fast, and comfortable boats; however all this comes with a substantial price tag.  Santa Cruz boats are made to order so the roughly $600,000 base price of a Santa Cruz 52 can climb to well over $1 million; even ten-year-old Santa Cruz 52's are fetching a half million dollars.  The newer Santa Cruz 53 with a base price of about $850,000 is substantially a more luxiourious and heavier adaptation of the 52.

A technique used to make these boats ultra-light is balsa wood cored hulls.  A criticism is that the boats need to be reefed in relatively lower winds, when heading to the wind.  Proponents argue that the Santa Cruz more than makes up for this deficiency in the downwind leg of a race.

Santa Cruz has recently begun manufacturing a  power boat named the Coastal Flyer, which sells for about $750,000.  It is designed to look like a 1930s launch, but is packed with modern electronics and jet drive propulsion.

Recently Santa Cruz Yachts has changed owners and has gone through a renovation period to bring the brand back. Within the last year Santa Cruz has designed a new boat, the SC37. It has received good responses in both the Newport Boat Show 2008 and the Annapolis Boat 2008. Santa Cruz is going to be in the process soon to start designing the SC47. The designer that Santa Cruz is working with now is Tim Kernan.

Awards 
 Sailing World's Boat of the Year, the Santa Cruz 52

Models 
NOTE: PHRF rating shown is the Northern California Base Rate full keel standard mast unless otherwise described
 SC27  -  PHRF 135
 SC33  -  PHRF 114
 SC40  -  PHRF 48
 SC44  -
 SC50  -  PHRF -6
 SC52  -  PHRF -15 (Southern California Buoy Rating) - Sailing World Magazine Overall "Boat Of The Year" winner in 1996
 SC52T -  PHRF -30 (Southern California Buoy Rating)
 SC53C  -
 SC70  -  PHRF -66
 Coastal Flyer 61 (motor launch)

See also 
 List of sailboat designers and manufacturers

References 
 Best boats to Build or Buy - Ference Mate - Albatross Publishing House 1982
 Fibreglass Boats 3rd edition, by Hugo Du Plessis A&C Black (publisher) 1996  
 Power & Motor Yacht Magazine, Santa Cruz Coastal Flyer — By Tim Clark — July 2002
 Yacht Magazine, Coastal Flyer 39, by Dennis Caprio Published: May 2002
 Sailing World Magazine, Boat of the Year Winners (1985-2003) August 26, 2003 by The Editors
 CNN Money Magazine (online), By John Tayman August 1, 2003
 Boater's Life -- Wepage -- Company Profile Santa Cruz Yachts
 Sailnet -- Perry on Design -- Review of Santa Cruz 63
 YRA of San Francisco Bay (Northern California PHRF rating chart)
 PHRF of Southern California
 Santa Cruz 27 National Class Association

Santa Cruz Yachts